The South Canyon Fire was a 1994 wildfire that took the lives of 14 wildland firefighters on Storm King Mountain, near Glenwood Springs, Colorado, on July 6, 1994.  It is often also referred to as the "Storm King" fire.

It was the subject of John Maclean's book Fire on the Mountain: The True Story of the South Canyon Fire.

Fire origin 

Initially small and well away from private property, the fire was assigned low priority and allowed to smolder for the first two days. By July 4, the fire had burned only . Nearby residents of Canyon Creek Estates, however, were growing increasingly concerned by the persistent blaze, prompting local authorities to take action. Due to the uneven terrain, and the efforts necessary to coordinate the incident response, it was decided that the fight against the fire would commence the following morning.

Incident 

On July 5, firefighters began their approach from the west at the east end of Canyon Creek Estates, making a difficult march up the rugged terrain along which is the present location of the Storm King Mountain Memorial Trail. Firefighters began constructing firelines to contain the blaze. The fight was joined that evening by smokejumpers who began aiding in the construction of the fireline, working well into the night of July 5 but quitting early due to "danger from rolling rocks." 

The following day, twenty Hotshots from Prineville, Oregon, were rushed to the fire to aid in the battle. That afternoon, a dry cold front passed through the area, increasing the winds and fire activity. By 4 p.m., the fire had "spotted" beyond the fireline and below the firefighters' location to the west and began to race towards them up the steep, densely vegetated terrain.

Casualties 
Twelve firefighters were unable to outrun the blaze and perished. Two more helitack firefighters were also killed as they tried to flee to the northwest. Those who died:

 Prineville Hotshots: Kathi Beck, Tamera Bickett, Scott Blecha, Levi Brinkley, Douglas Dunbar, Terri Hagen, Bonnie Holtby, Rob Johnson, Jon Kelso.
 Missoula Smokejumper: Don Mackey
 McCall Smokejumpers: Roger Roth, Jim Thrash.
 Helitack: Robert Browning, Jr., Richard Tyler.

Memorials 

The Storm King Mountain Memorial Trail, closely following the actual path the firefighters hiked to fight the blaze, leads visitors to the site. Plaques and memorials line the trail explaining the events and paying homage to those who fell. Crosses were installed where each person fell. Memorials have also been constructed at Two Rivers Park in Glenwood Springs, at Ochoco Creek Park in Prineville, Oregon, and in McDonald Forest's Peavy Arboretum near Corvallis, Oregon.

Footnotes 
 

Garfield County, Colorado
Wildfires in Colorado
1994 fires in the United States
1994 natural disasters in the United States
1990s wildfires in the United States
1994 in Colorado
White River National Forest
July 1994 events in the United States
Death in Colorado
History of firefighting